Catherine H. Gebotys  is a Canadian computer engineer specializing in the security of embedded systems and in cryptographic algorithms more  She is a professor of electrical and computer engineering at the

Education
Gebotys graduated from the University of Toronto in 1982 with a bachelor's degree in engineering science, and earned a master's degree in electrical engineering there in 1984. She completed her Ph.D. in 1991 at the University of  Her dissertation, A Global Optimization Approach to Architectural Synthesis of VLSI Digital Synchronous Systems with Analog and Asynchronous Interfaces, was supervised by

Books
Gebotys is the author of the book Security in Embedded Devices (Springer, 2010). With Elmasry, she is the coauthor of Optimal VLSI Architectural Synthesis: Area, Performance and Testability (Kluwer, 1992).

References

External links
Home page

1960 births
Living people
Computer engineers
Canadian electrical engineers
Canadian women engineers
University of Toronto alumni
University of Waterloo alumni
Academic staff of the University of Waterloo